Presepsin (soluble CD14 subtype, sCD14-ST) is a 13-kDa-cleavage product of CD14 receptor.

Function 
Presepsin is a soluble PRR. Presepsin in the circulation is an indicator of monocyte-macrophage activation in response to pathogens.

Clinical relevance 
Several clinical studies have demonstrated that presepsin is a specific and sensitive marker for the diagnosis, severity assessment and outcome prediction of sepsis. In addition, presepsin can be used for diagnosing infections in patients with a chronic inflammatory condition, such as liver cirrhosis.

References 

Blood proteins
Biomarkers